Jeremy Lee Chun-kit (born 8 September 1995), is a Hong Kong singer, dancer, actor, and member of Hong Kong boy group Mirror. In 2022, he made his solo debut with the single "Half".

Career

2018–present: Mirror 
In 2018, Lee competed in the reality television show Good Night Show King Maker created by ViuTV. Lee was initially criticised by netizens for having a Korean style and lacking unique personalities. He managed to advance to the final10 and finished at ninth overall. In November 2018, Lee made his debut as a member of the boy music group Mirror at a press conference with their debut single "In a Second" (一秒間).

Lee made his acting debut in the 2018 television series Being An Actor.  He has a supporting role in the spin-off drama Showman's Show. Lee portrays Chris 3 in the 2020 youth sport drama We are the Littles.

Lee released an unofficial solo song "Dream Words" on 1 June 2021 on his own YouTube channel. His fans, named Unicorn, spent thousands of HK dollars to promote the song at various bus stops. They also organised an advertisement campaign, and art exhibition at the Jao Tsung-I Academy, purchasing various billboards at prime locations and decorating public buses with Lee's pictures for his twenty-sixth birthday.

On 12 May 2021, Lee opened another Youtube channel, named "Dragon and Piglet" (巨龍與豬仔 Stanley & Jeremy) together with Stanley Yau, a fellow member of Mirror.

2022–present: Solo activities 
On 22 February 2022, Lee made his solo debut with the single "Half". On 18 July 2022, Lee released his second single, "Nine (九). On 27 October 2022, Lee released his third single, "Apollo" (阿波羅). At the Ultimate Song Chart Awards Presentation 2022, Lee won the Best Male Newcomer Gold Award. 

On 6 March 2023, Lee released his fourth single, "CLOSER".

Discography

As lead artist

Filmography

Film

Television series

Variety show

Videography

Music videos

Awards and Nominations

References

External links 
 
 
 

1995 births
Living people
Hong Kong male television actors
Hong Kong television personalities
21st-century Hong Kong male singers
Hong Kong idols
King Maker contestants
Mirror (group) members